Sun Singer is a premier reality TV Indian singing competition in the Tamil language that is being broadcast on Sun TV. Season 1 to 5, It is a singing talent hunt for children of age group 6 to 13 years old in Tamil Nadu. Season 6, It is a singing talent hunt for children of age group 14 to 60 years old in Tamil Nadu The show has had over six successful seasons so far.

According to Sun TV's website, the show is a reinvented version of its Indian singing competition and mega reality TV show, Sapthaswarangal. Sapthaswarangal was hugely successful, with the show being renewed for multiple seasons, telecast for over a decade on Sun TV, and introducing multiple playback singers including Chinmayi, Karthik, Mahathi, Ranjith, and Vinaya Karthik Rajan.

The show airs weekly on Sundays at 1:00pm on Sun TV.

Season 1

Season 1 of the show was sponsored by Cadbury Oreo, and co-sponsored by VCare, GRB Udhayam Ghee, and Premier Cookware & Appliances. Season 1 was hosted by singer Manasi, while singers Anuradha Sriram and Pushpavanam Kuppuswamy appeared as permanent judges for the season. Lyricist and music director Gangai Amaran appeared as the show's permanent voice trainer. The winner up was secured by AC Gaayathri

Season 2

Season 2 of the show was sponsored by Pudhiya ("New") Cadbury Oreo Strawberry Cream, and co-sponsored by VCare, Jayachandran Textiles, and Premier Cookware & Appliances. Each portion of season 2 was hosted by a different personality, beginning with actress Nisha Krishnan, followed b y television anchor Reshma Pasupuleti, followed by lyricist and music director Gangai Amaran, and finally followed by singer Kamalaja Rajagopal. Playback singers Anuradha Sriram and Pushpavanam Kuppuswamy returned as permanent judges for the season, while Gangai Amaran returned as the show's permanent voice trainer. The top contestants were Aishwarya, Ishwarya, Poojaa Sree ,Akhilesh,Abhinaya, Akshara Shritharan, Dhenuka, Manoj Krishna, Maalavika, Krithika, Krishnakanth, Harshitha, Nithya sri, Harini, Ishwarya, Kavya, Megha, Prarthana, Sneha, Sanjana and Vrusha.

Season 3

Season 3 of the show was sponsored by Pudhiya ("New") Cadbury Oreo Strawberry Cream, and co-sponsored by VCare, Jayachandran Textiles, and Premier Cookware & Appliances. The second half of the season was hosted by Aishwarya Prabhakar, while Anuradha Sriram, Pushpavanam Kuppuswamy, and Gangai Amaran retained as permanent judges for the season.

The winner of the season was set to win a series of prizes from sponsors of the show, and would receive a trophy as title winner. Nine of the final contestants were selected to perform in the finals and compete in the grand finale, part 1 of which was telecast on 28 December 2014. The results of the competition were announced in the second portion telecast on 4 January 2015 by the chief guest at the finale, music director G. V. Prakash Kumar.

Contestant Shreya Jaydeep was announced as the winner of season 3 in the second portion of the grand finale telecast on 4 January 2015. Contestant Sandra was crowned runner-up of season 3, and contestant Swetha Sri was crowned best entertainer of the season.

Season 4

The show airs on Sundays at 11:00am on Sun TV, and is hosted by Nakshathra & Muthu.

Season 4 of the show is sponsored by Cadbury Oreo, and co-sponsored by VCare, GRB Udhayam Ghee, and Vasanth & Co.

Show format

Open auditions
The open auditions are conducted in various cities in Tamil Nadu and are the first stage in determining the finalists of each season. During this stage, contestants sing a song or two before a panel of preliminary audition judges. The panel then decides on-the-spot whether the contestant demonstrated enough ability and performance value to proceed further. If the contestant exhibited exceptional ability in their performance, judges "select" the contestant to move instantly one step forward in the competition. Alternatively, if judges are on the fence about the singer, they will place the contestant on a waitlist until the end of that day's auditions. Otherwise, if the contestant lacks the ability and performance value to proceed further, the contestant will be rejected.

Participating contestants are given chocolate or chocolate biscuits to encourage them to perform.

Final level auditions
The final auditions are conducted to select the finalists of each season from the contestants who were selected during open auditions. During this stage, contestants sing a song or two before a panel of final level audition judges. Again, the panel decides on-the-spot whether the contestant demonstrated enough ability and performance value to proceed further. If the contestant exhibited exceptional ability in their performance, judges "select" the contestant to move instantly one step forward in the competition. Alternatively, if judges are on the fence about the singer, they will place the contestant on a waitlist until the end of that day's auditions. Otherwise, if the contestant lacks the ability and performance value to proceed further, the contestant will be rejected.

Participating contestants are again given chocolate biscuits to encourage them to perform.

Auditions
Open auditions were held across Tamil Nadu.

Live Grand Finale (10 January 2016)
 Hosts: Nakshathra & Muthu
 Celebrity Guests, Performers, and Judges: Vijay Antony, Sri Divya, Ramki, Khushbu, Leon James, Andrea Jeremiah, Ranjith, Suchithra, Remya Nambeesan, Siddharth, Hiphop Tamizha, Shrutika, Devi Sri Prasad, Nirosha, G. V. Prakash, Sangeetha Krish, Krish, Anuradha Sriram, and Gangai AmaranGrand Final Results (Season 4)

Post Finals

Season 5

Grand Finale (12 February 2017)
 Hosts: Nakshathra & Dhilip Rayan & Muthu
 Celebrity Guests, Performers, and Judges: Prabhu Deva, Santhosh Narayanan, Shankar–Ganesh, Sundar C, Kovai Sarala, Vijay Antony, P. Unnikrishnan, Shruti Haasan, Raghava Lawrence, Arunraja Kamaraj, Mahathi, Nithyasree Mahadevan, A. R. Reihana, Yuvan Shankar Raja, Sanghavi, Uthara Unnikrishnan, Shanthanu Bhagyaraj, Bharath, Lakshmi Menon, Arun Vijay, Ramya NSK, Vinaya Karthik Rajan, Sanchita Shetty, Krish, Anuradha Sriram, and Gangai Amaran

Grand Final Results (Season 5)

References

External links 

Sun TV original programming
Tamil-language singing talent shows
2013 Tamil-language television series debuts
Tamil-language reality television series
Tamil-language television shows
2010s Tamil-language television series
2013 Tamil-language television seasons
2014 Tamil-language television seasons
2015 Tamil-language television seasons
2016 Tamil-language television seasons
2017 Tamil-language television seasons
Indian music television series